Wola Batorska  is a village in the administrative district of Gmina Niepołomice, within Wieliczka County, Lesser Poland Voivodeship, in southern Poland.

The village has a population of 3,000.

References

Villages in Wieliczka County